Naibedya (Bengali: নৈবেদ্য; English: Offerings) is a famous Bengali language poetry book by Rabindranath Tagore. It was published in 1901. It is a great creation in the "Intermediate Period" of Rabindranath's poetry. Tagore had included 15 poems of "Naibedya" in the Nobel Prize winning book Song Offerings.

Theme 
In Rabindranath's "Naibedya", there is a scattering of spiritual thoughts. In it he describes the spiritual greatness of Ancient India.

References

External links 

 rabindra-rachanabali.nltr.org (Bengali)

1901 poetry books
Bengali poetry collections
Poetry collections by Rabindranath Tagore
Indian poetry books